Henrik Sureni Malyan (also transliterated Henrik Malian; September 30, 1925 – March 14, 1988) was an Armenian film director and writer.

He was born in Telavi, Georgia. Malyan's uncle was famous actor David Malyan. He studied chess at an early age, along with Tigran Petrosian. From 1942 to 1945 he worked as a draftsman and designer at a factory in Tbilisi. In 1951 he graduated from the Yerevan State Institute of Theatre and Cinematography. Between 1951 and 1954, he was a director at various theatres in Armenia. In 1953, he graduated from the Moscow Theatre Institute. From 1954 on he worked with the film studio Armenfilm.

His 1977 film Nahapet (Life Triumphs) is considered to be one of the most important Armenian films to deal with the Armenian genocide. It was exhibited in the 1978 Cannes Film Festival.

In 1980 he founded the Henrik Malyan Theatre-Studio for stage works.

In 1982 he was named a People's Artist of the USSR.

Films
As director unless noted.
 Guys from the Army Band (1961)
 Road to the Stage (1963)
 Mr. Jacques and Others (1966, "The Sham Informer" segment)
 Triangle (1967)
 We and Our Mountains (1970)
 Father (1973)
 Life Triumphs (Nahapet; 1977, also writer)
 A Piece of Sky (1980, also writer)
 Gikor (1982, writer)
 A Drop of Honey (1984, also writer)
 White Dreams (1985, writer)
 Yearning (1990, writer)

Awards 

 State Prize of the Armenian SSR (1975)
 People's Artist of the Armenian SSR (1977)
 People's Artist of the USSR (1982)

References

External links

Armenian screenwriters
1925 births
1988 deaths
People's Artists of Armenia
People from Telavi
People's Artists of the USSR
Georgian people of Armenian descent
Soviet Armenians
20th-century screenwriters
Armenian film directors